{{Motorsport venue
| Name             = DuQuoin State Fairgrounds Racetrack
| Nicnames        = 
| Time             = GMT-6
| Location         = Du Quoin, Illinois
| Coordinates      = 
| Image            = 
| Image_caption    = 
| Capacity         = 
| Owner            = 
| Operator         = 
| Broke_ground     = 
| Opened           = 1946
| Closed           = 
| Construction_cost= 
| Architect        = 
| Former_names     = 
| Events           = ARCA Menards SeriesGeneral Tire Grabber 100USAC Silver Crown SeriesTony Bettenhausen 100American Flat TrackDuQuoin Mile
| Miles_first      = True
| Layout1          = Oval
| Surface          = Clay
| Length_km        = 1.6
| Length_mi        = 1
| Turns            = 4
|Record_time    = 31.805
|Record_driver  =  Sheldon Creed
|Record_car     = Toyota Camry
|Record_year    = 2018
|Record_class   = Stock car
It is a stop on the ARCA Menards Series, USAC Silver Crown Series and American Flat Track.

History
The DuQuoin State Fair was founded in 1923 by local businessman William R. "W.R." Hayes, who owned the fair and ran it. (It did not become run by the state of Illinois as a true "state fair" until the 1980s; it is now officially called the Illinois State Fair in DuQuoin, as opposed to the longtime one at state capital Springfield.) At the start Hayes had a half-mile harness-racing track on his 30-acre site, with wooden grandstands that seated 3000. In 1939 Hayes started buying adjoining stripmined land to develop its potential as parkland, replanting it and turning the strip pits into family-friendly ponds and lakes. He eventually expanded his little fairgrounds into 1200 acres.

The DuQuoin "Magic Mile" racetrack was constructed on reclaimed stripmine land in 1946 by W.R. Hayes. The track's first national championship race was held in September 1948.  In the second race on October 10, popular AAA National driving champion Ted Horn was killed in the fourth turn when a spindle on his championship car broke.  The national championship race for the USAC Silver Crown dirt cars is held in his honor.

In 1957 the DuQuoin State Fairgrounds became the third longtime home of the Hambletonian, America's premier harness racing event (established 1926). The grandstands and bleachers were expanded to seat 18,000. When the Hambletonian left DuQuoin after 1980 to be raced at the Meadowlands, the Fair became the home of the World Trotting Derby. This race was held from 1981 until it was discontinued after the 2009 race.   Both off-track and on-track betting are allowed.

Music concerts are also held at the track, especially during the state fair (in 2012 from August 25 through Labor Day, September 3). The stage is at center at the foot of the grandstand, backed up against the protective cyclone fence that shields the stands from the track.

Race winners

AAA/USAC Champ Car/Silver Crown race winnersAll winners were  American''

ARCA Racing Series

Lap Records

References

External links
Official DuQuoin State Fair Website
Track Enterprises Website
DuQuoin State Fairgrounds archive at Racing-Reference

Motorsport venues in Illinois
ARCA Menards Series tracks
NASCAR tracks
Buildings and structures in Perry County, Illinois
Tourist attractions in Perry County, Illinois